Nicki Sørensen (born 14 May 1975) is a Danish former professional road bicycle racer, and was directeur sportif of UCI Professional Continental team . He competed in five consecutive editions of the Tour de France from 2001 to 2005. Riding as an all-round rider who rode well in hilly terrain, Sørensen was a valued support for the team leader without many wins of his own.

Biography
Sørensen only started his cycling career at the age of 19, having been a runner before that. He became a professional road bicycle racer in 1999 for team Team Chicky World. After the team closed down, Sørensen switched to another Denmark based team, Team Fakta where he made a good name for himself on the Danish stage as one of the strongest cards of Team Fakta, securing himself a place on the Danish team for the 2000 Olympics.

Before the 2001 season, Sørensen was on the verge of joining British Linda McCartney Racing Team but instead opted to stay in Denmark with Team CSC – World Online, as Team Saxo Bank was then known. In his first year with the team he participated in the 2001 Tour de France where he got a taste of success with a fourth place on stage 16. After then, Sørensen was a consistent part of the Tour setup for Team CSC, riding the biggest race in the cycling calendar every year from 2001 to 2005, his highlights including the overall GC rank of 20th in 2002. Another highlight was Sørensen's instrumental role in team captain Tyler Hamilton's win on stage 16 of the 2003 Tour de France when Sørensen, who was in a break away, sacrificed his own chances in order to pull Hamilton and thereby allow Tyler Hamilton to conserve the strength needed to win on the day.

Nicki Sørensen started the 2005 season on a high note with a win in GP d'Ouverture la Marseillaise and a fourth place in Tour Méditerranéen during February, and during the season he prolonged his contract with Team CSC until 2007. In September Nicki Sørensen clinched stage 18 of the Vuelta a España after defeating Pascual Rodriguez in the sprint.

On 16 July 2009, Sørensen won Stage 12 of the 2009 Tour de France. He was in an early breakaway with five other riders and attacked the small group with 20 km to cover to win solo.

Sørensen retired after riding the 2014 Giro di Lombardia. The last victory of his career was the 2012 Gran Premio Bruno Beghelli.

Team management
For the 2016 season he moved across to the Israeli Cycling Academy Team. In October 2016 the new  team announced that Sørensen would join them as a sports director for their inaugural season in 2017. Aqua Blue Sport folded at the end of 2018.

Doping 
In June 2015 prior to Anti Doping Denmark report he admitted to drug use in early part of his career.

Major results

1999
 1st Lemvig Løbet
 1st Stage 4 Rheinland-Pfalz Rundfahrt
2000
 1st Lemvig-Holstebro-Lemvig
 1st Overall Circuit des Mines
1st Stage 1
 1st Rund um Hanleite-Erfur
2001
 9th Giro del Piemonte
2003
 1st  Road race, National Road Championships
2005
 1st GP d'Ouverture la Marseillaise
 1st Stage 18 Vuelta a España
 7th Züri-Metzgete
2006
 1st Stage 1 (TTT) Vuelta a España
2007
 5th Overall Sachsen Tour
 5th Overall Danmark Rundt
 7th Overall Bayern Rundfahrt
2008
 1st  Road race, National Road Championships
2009
 Tour de France
1st Stage 12
 Combativity award Stage 12
 1st Stage 2 Danmark Rundt
2010
 1st  Road race, National Road Championships
2011
 1st  Road race, National Road Championships
 2nd Overall Bayern Rundfahrt
 3rd Giro del Friuli
2012
 1st Gran Premio Bruno Beghelli
2013
 6th Overall Circuit de la Sarthe

References

External links

Profile at Team Saxo Bank

1975 births
Living people
Danish male cyclists
Cyclists at the 2000 Summer Olympics
Cyclists at the 2004 Summer Olympics
Cyclists at the 2008 Summer Olympics
Cyclists at the 2012 Summer Olympics
Olympic cyclists of Denmark
Danish Vuelta a España stage winners
Danish Tour de France stage winners
People from Hillerød Municipality
Danish sportspeople in doping cases
Doping cases in cycling
Sportspeople from the Capital Region of Denmark